Edward Mashinya or Masinwa (born February 22, 1984 in Harare, Zimbabwe) is a Zimbabwean football player who plays for MEAP Nisou in the Cypriot Third Division as a striker.

External links 

1984 births
Living people
Sportspeople from Harare
Zimbabwean footballers
Zimbabwean expatriate footballers
Association football forwards
Cypriot First Division players
Cypriot Second Division players
AC Omonia players
Onisilos Sotira players
PAEEK players
Omonia Aradippou players
APOP Kinyras FC players
Ethnikos Achna FC players
Olympiakos Nicosia players
Karmiotissa FC players
Othellos Athienou F.C. players
Ermis Aradippou FC players
MEAP Nisou players
Expatriate footballers in Cyprus